William "Curley" Andrews was an American baseball second baseman and third baseman in the Negro leagues. He played with the Philadelphia Stars in 1943 and the New York Black Yankees in 1944.

References

External links
 and Baseball-Reference Black Baseball Stats and  Seamheads 

Philadelphia Stars players
New York Black Yankees players
Year of birth missing
Year of death missing
Baseball second basemen
Baseball third basemen